BFR may refer to:

Organizations
 Brampton Fire and Rescue, the statutory fire department of Brampton, Ontario
 Bloody Fist Records, a record label
 Botafogo de Futebol e Regatas, a Brazilian football (soccer) club
 Federal Institute for Risk Assessment (BfR), a German authority in the field of food and product safety

Products
 Brominated flame retardants, chemicals applied to materials to make them fire-resistant
 Magnum Research BFR, a.k.a. Biggest, Finest, Revolver or  Big Frame Revolver; a model of handgun

Medicine
 Blood flow restriction training
 Body fat redistribution syndrome
 Vascular occlusion or Blood flow restriction
Vascular occlusion training

Transportation
 Biennial flight review, an external review mandated for pilots in many countries
 Big Falcon Rocket, former name for SpaceX Starship
 Blackfriars station, London, UK (station code BFR)
 Bekal Fort railway station, Kasaragod district, Kerala, India (station code BFR)
 Virgil I. Grissom Municipal Airport, Bedford, Lawrence County, Indiana, US (IATA airport code BFR)
 Blackhawk Farms Raceway, South Beloit, Illinois, USA
 Bala and Festiniog Railway, North Wales, UK

Slang
 Military slang for Big Fucking Rock 
 Boombox, i.e. Big Fucking Radio 
 SpaceX for "Big Fucking Rocket"

Other uses
 Bazigar language (ISO 639 language code bfr)
 Berkeley Fiction Review, an American literary magazine
 Breast feeding relationship, formally known as erotic lactation

See also
 BFG (disambiguation)